The Ambassador Extraordinary and Plenipotentiary of the Russian Federation to the Kingdom of Cambodia is the official representative of the President and the Government of Russia to the King and the Government of Cambodia.

The ambassador and his staff work at large in the Embassy of Russia in Phnom Penh.

History of diplomatic relations

Until 1953 Cambodia was under the French rule, gaining independence from France on 9 November 1953. The Soviet Union and Cambodia established diplomatic relations on 13 May 1956. In October 1956 the Soviet Union appointed  as its first representative to Cambodia. Anikin served until 1959. 

In 1970 the Soviet Union recalled all its diplomats, including the ambassador, from Cambodia and diplomatic relations between the two countries were interrupted. They resumed in April 1979.

List of representatives (1956 – present)

Representatives of the Soviet Union to Cambodia (1956 – 1991)

Representatives of the Russian Federation to Cambodia (1991 – present)

See also
 Foreign relations of Russia
 Foreign relations of Cambodia

References

External 
  Embassy of Russia to Cambodia

 
Cambodia
Russia